The Magic Shoes ( or Rawng tah laep plaep) is a Thai 1992 fantasy dance film, directed and edited with co-written by Prachya Pinkaew.

Plot
The film tells the story of Touch, a young man who loves dance. One day, he possessed a pair of sneakers that had the super power created by lightning. They made him a fiery dancer overnight.

Cast
Touch Na Takuathung as Touch (main character)
Watsana Phunphon as Ann (Touch love interest)
Boriboon Chanrueng as Tuk (Touch younger brother) 
Jaturong Kolimart as X (Touch main dancer rival and younger brother of Duke)
Panudej Wattanasuchart as Duke (influential millionaire and lover of Ann – cameo)

Production
The film is based on the fame and popularity of Touch Na Takuathung, a pop dance star of RS Promotion in 1990s. Considered as Prachya Pinkaew's debut film before becoming world famous with martial arts film Ong-Bak: Muay Thai Warrior in 2003.

It is also the first film produced and distributed by RS Promotion (before the establishment of RS Film), and the debut of some performers, such as Boriboon Chanrueng, Watsana Phunphon and Jaturong Kolimart from the boyband Hijack.

Its Thai title "Rawng tah laep plaep" is slang that probably means "flashing shoes".

Music

Original soundtrack

The film's soundtracks were composed and produced by Mongkolpat Thongrueang, a key producer of RS Promotion and Na Takuathung's trusted producer, assist by Thanapol Intharit, another key personnel of RS label.

References

External links
 

1992 directorial debut films
Films directed by Prachya Pinkaew
Thai-language films
Thai fantasy films
Thai teen films
1992 fantasy films
1990s dance films